Jeanette Miller is an American character actress who has appeared in theatre, film, and television series, best known as Aunt Edie on the ABC comedy series The Middle, which she played from 2009 until 2012, when her character was said to have died from old age. In film, she appeared in Cold Heaven, The Truman Show, Norbit, Four Christmases, and Legion.

Filmography

Artists and Models (1955)
Lux Video Theatre (1 episode, 1955)
That Certain Feeling (1956) 
The Vagabond King (1956)
Heart, Soul and Plastic (1982)
Riptide (1 episode, 1984)
Finder of Lost Love (1 episode, 1985) 
Circle of Violence: A Family Drama (1986)
Beauty and the Beast (1 episode, 1987) 
Night Court (1 episode, 1988) 
The Diamond Trap (1988)
Quantum Leap (1 episode, 1989) 
Flesh 'n' Blood (1 episode, 1991) 
Cold Heaven (1991)
Designing Women (2 episodes, 1989–1992) 
Hearts Afire (1 episode, 1992) 
Evening Shade (1 episode, 1993) 
Saved by the Bell: The New Class (1 episode, 1995) 
Murphy Brown (2 episodes, 1991–1995) 
Step by Step (1 episode, 1996) 
MADtv (2 episodes, 1995–1996) 
Wings (1 episode, 1996) 
Coach (1 episode, 1996) 
Malcolm & Eddie (1 episode, 1996) 
Star Trek: Voyager (1 episode, 1997) 
Seinfeld (1 episode, 1998) 
Clueless (1 episode, 1998) 
The Truman Show (1998)
Suddenly Susan (1 episode, 1998) 
The Brian Benben Show (1 episode, 1998) 
The Tony Danza Show (1 episode, 1998) 
Melrose Place (1 episode, 1998) 
Home Improvement (1 episode, 1999) 
Replacing Dad (1999)
Austin Powers: The Spy Who Shagged Me (1999)
Friends (1 episode, 1999) 
Just Shoot Me! (1 episode, 1999) 
The Pretender (1 episode, 1999) 
The Norm Show (1 episode, 1999) 
Charmed (1 episode, 2000) 
Becker (1 episode, 2000) 
Jack & Jill (1 episode, 2001) 
The Medicine Show (2001)
Corky Romano (2001)
Not Another Teen Movie (2001)
Stuck (2001)
Providence (1 episode, 2001) 
100 Deeds for Eddie McDowd (3 episodes, 2001–2002) 
Sabrina, the Teenage Witch (1 episode, 2002) 
MDs (1 episode, 2002) 
Duty Dating (2002)
The Third Wheel (2002)
Stealing Harvard (2002)
The Warriors of the 14th Fairway (2002) 
The Bernie Mac Show (1 episode, 2003)
SpongeBob SquarePants (Episode: "The Sponge Who Could Fly"; 2003)
I'm with Her (1 episode, 2004) 
The Shield (1 episode, 2004) 
Malcolm in the Middle (1 episode, 2004) 
According to Jim (1 episode, 2004) 
Kitchen Confidential (1 episode, 2006) 
My Name Is Earl (2 episodes, 2005–2006) 
Dexter (1 episode, 2006) 
Scrubs (1 episode, 2007) 
Norbit (2007)
Quality Time (2008)
Four Christmases (2008)
Carpoolers (2 episodes, 2008) 
ER (2 episodes, 1994, 2009) 
10 Things I Hate About You (1 episode, 2009) 
Legion (2010) (Gladys Foster)
Elevator Girl (2010)
Brothers & Sisters (1 episode, 2010) 
Perfect Couples (2 episodes, 2011) 
The Change-Up (2011)
The Middle, Aunt Edie, (recurring character, 20092012)

References

External links
 

Living people
American film actresses
American television actresses
21st-century American women
Year of birth missing (living people)